Hirt is a surname. Notable people with the surname include:

Al Hirt (1922–1999), American trumpeter and bandleader
Aloys Hirt (1759–1837), German art historian and archaeologist
August Hirt (1898–1945), German SS officer
Egon Hirt (born 1960), German alpine skier
Ferenc Hirt (1967–2018), Hungarian businessman and politician
Hassan Hirt (born 1980), French long-distance runner
Hermann Hirt (1865–1936), German philologist and Indo-Europeanist
Jan Hirt (born 1991), Czech cyclist
John Hirt (born 1943), Australian pastor and educator
Peter Hirt (1910–1992), Swiss racing driver
Susanne Hirt (born 1973), German slalom canoeist